Jeanne Henriette Louis (often spelled Jeanne-Henriette Louis; born 1938 in Bordeaux), is professor emeritus of civilization in North America at the University of Orléans, France.

Her work relates to psychological warfare and the peace movement.

Thesis 
In 1983, Jeanne Henriette Louis defended her thesis on psychological warfare in the United States during World War II, entitled Les concepts de guerre psychologique aux États-Unis de 1939 à 1943, l’engrenage de la violence ("The concepts of psychological warfare in the United States from 1939 to 1943, the cycle of violence"). She felt that research on colonial America had ignored important elements, and her postdoctoral work focused on the seventeenth and eighteenth centuries in North America.

Jeanne Henriette Louis says that comparisons between the French colonization of the Americas (French colonial) and the British colonization of the Americas (British colonial America) have rarely been conducted, and this field of investigation is rich and promising.

Academic career 
Assistant in the department of English at the University of Orleans in 1970, Jeanne Henriette Louis became professor of American civilization in 1989. In 2001 she retired as professor emeritus.

Research Topics 
Following her PhD, Jeanne Henriette Louis became interested in peace movements and especially the Religious Society of Friends (Quakers), the Quakers of Nantucket, the neutrality of Acadia during the Franco-British wars, as well as the founding of Pennsylvania by William Penn.

Commitments

Active in the Religious Society of Friends (Quakers) in France, and a member of the sponsoring committee of the French Coalition for the Decade (2010).

Books 
 J.H. Louis, L'engrenage de la violence. La guerre psychologique aux États-Unis pendant la Deuxième Guerre mondiale, Payot, Paris, 1987, 342 p. Abridged version of the doctoral thesis of state.
 J.H. Louis et J.O. Héron, William Penn et les quakers. Ils inventèrent le Nouveau Monde, coll. Découvertes Gallimard vol. 90, Paris: Gallimard, 1990, 176 p.
 J.H. Louis, La société religieuse des Amis (quakers), Coll. Fils d’Abraham, Turnhout, Brepols, Belgique, 2005.

References

External links 
 "The quest for authentic French year Quakerism: A conversation with Jeanne-Henriette Louis," in Quaker Theology, issue 18, Fall-Winter 2010–2011, p. 45-60 (Fayetteville NC: Quaker Ecumenical Seminars in Theology - QUEST) Online.
 Works by Jeanne Henriette Louis and on the bibliographic database online WorldCat

1938 births
Living people
Academic staff of the University of Orléans
Peace and conflict scholars